Statilia Messalina (c. AD 35 – after 68) was a Roman patrician woman, a Roman Empress and third wife to Roman Emperor Nero.

Biography

Background
The ancient sources say little of her family; however, Suetonius states that she was a great-great-granddaughter of Titus Statilius Taurus, a Roman general who was awarded a triumph for his victory and was twice consul. She was either the daughter of Titus Statilius Taurus Corvinus, consul in 45 AD, and who was involved in a plot against the Emperor Claudius, or a daughter of the sister of Corvinus, Statilia Messallina. Her grandmother might have been Valeria Messalina Corvina, one of the daughters of Roman senator Marcus Valerius Messalla Corvinus who served as consul in 31 BC.

Marriages
Her fourth husband was the consul Marcus Julius Vestinus Atticus to whom she may have borne a son (who died in 88 AD). Around 65 AD, she became Nero's mistress. After the death of the emperor's second wife Poppaea Sabina, Vestinus was forced to commit suicide in 66, so Nero could marry Statilia.

Although witty and scheming, she was far less flamboyant than her predecessor and kept a rather low profile in the public eye. She was one of the few of Nero's courtiers who survived the fall of his reign. After Nero's death, Otho promised that he would marry her, before his suicide in 69 AD.

See also
Julio-Claudian family tree

References

Citations

Bibliography
 Syme, R., Augustan Aristocracy
 Griffin, Miriam, Nero. The End of a Dynasty. Batsford, London, 1984
 Raepsaet-Charlier M.-Th., Prosopographie des femmes de l'ordre sénatorial (Ier-IIe siècles), 2 vol., Louvain, 1987, 360 ff.
 Zanker, P, Fittschen, K., Katalog der römischen Porträts in den Capitolinischen Museen und den anderen kommunalen Sammlungen der Stadt Rom,  Mainz am Rhein, 1983, 75, Taf.93.94.
Annals
Lives of the Twelve Caesars
Satires

External links
Coinage of Statilia

35 births
1st-century deaths
1st-century Roman empresses
Roman patricians
Messalina
Wives of Nero